Manikya Malaraya Poovi is a Mappila song originally composed by Thalassery Rafeeque in 1978 and performed by Eranjoli Moosa. The song which was later recomposed by Shaan Rahman for the 2018 Malayalam film Oru Adaar Love is sung by Vineeth Sreenivasan. It became the fastest video from South India to receive 50 million views on YouTube.

Background
Manikya Malaraya Poovi is considered as one of the finest songs in the Mappila Song, a folklore Muslim music genre in Kerala. Originally composed by Thalassery K. Refeeque in 1978, it was written by P.A Jabbar and is performed by Eranjoli Moosa. The song is also considered as one of the best performance by Moosa and he has performed it in several stages. The song compares the beauty of Khadijah, the wife of Prophet Muhammad, to a pearl flower, during her first interaction with him. In 2018, the song was recreated by Shaan Rahman for the film Oru Adaar Love directed by Omar Lulu and was sung by Vineeth Sreenivasan.

Popularity
Before its release, a short clip from the song, that shows the actress Priya Prakash Varrier winking was released which became viral on social media. Later, the song also became trending on youtube upon its release and became the fastest South Indian video to get 50 million views.

Controversy
A group of Muslims filed a fatwa complaint with the Hyderabad police, accusing the visuals in the song hurting their religious sentiments, since the song contained references to Prophet Muhammad's wife Khadija. Raza Academy, which represents the Sunni Muslims of the Barelvi sect in Mumbai demanded to cut the objectionable portions of the song, and threatened to launch a nation-wide agitation if their demand was not met. The Supreme Court of India turned down the verdict and let the song free.

References

2018 songs
Malayalam film songs
Indian songs